Shunra Software, LLC was a privately held company that provided network virtualization solutions for software testing. On March 4, 2014, HP announced that it signed a definitive agreement to acquire the network virtualization business and technology of Shunra, which was an HP partner.

History
Founded in Israel in 1998, the company received investment from Insight Venture Partners and Carmel Ventures in 2004 and moved its headquarters to Philadelphia in 2006. In 2010, Gary Jackson was appointed the CEO. In 2013, Shunra announced an open integration platform for mobile app performance. As part of this launch, a partnership was formed with  Hewlett-Packard (HP), Jamo, Capgemini, SOASTA, and Keynote DeviceAnywhere.  In October 2012, the company signed a global distribution agreement with HP which placed two of Shunra's products on the HP commercial price list.

On March 4, 2014, HP announced that it had signed a definitive agreement to acquire the network virtualization business and technology of Shunra. On April 1, 2014, HP acquired the network virtualization business and technology of Shunra.

References

Virtualization software
Emulation software
Software companies of Israel
Hewlett-Packard acquisitions
2014 mergers and acquisitions